Siddhartha Ray (widely known as Sidhu) is an Indian singer, lyricist, composer, playback writer, and actor from Kolkata, West Bengal. He is one of the pioneers of the Bangla Rock genre. Prior to pursuing his career in music, Sidhu left his dream profession of being a doctor and formed the band Cactus, of which he is the front man. The band offered a new genre in the Bengali music scene–a Bengali rock band. Songs like Holud Paakhi have become a household name. Sidhu also tried his luck at acting, presenting quiz shows as quiz master, musical game show presenting, and singer as a soloist in many Bengali films. Since then he has gone on to compose, write lyrics, and sing for his band. In 2013, he and his band made their debut in Tollywood (Bengali cinema), composing the songs for Nil Nirjane. They won the Mirchi Music Awards Bangla several times.

Music 
Ray has been writing songs since his childhood days. His biggest break was the self-titled debut album of Cactus. Released in 1999 from HMV, it became a rage with a touch of blues and psychedelic rock. With numbers like Brishti, oooh Ma! and Icchamati this album portrayed psychedelia in Bengali music for the first time. Halud pakhi, on the other hand, created a long-lasting sensation in the contemporary Bengali music scene with its nostalgic feel being perfectly accompanied by Shudhu Tumi Ele Na and Amra Bhishon Eka complementing the overall mood of the album. They tasted some success when their first self-titled album was released in 1999 by HMV.

Apart from band music, ray has many singles under his name, among them songs like Keno emon hoy, onno corridor from album 'Letters from Siliguri', Mayabini, and Buro Radio are very famous.

As a playback artist, he has also sung for many films, among them Esho Bondhu from the film Uma, which is very famous.

Discography

Films: Nil Nirjane (2001–2002) 
In 2002, Cactus composed and performed the score for the Bengali movie Nil Nirjane. The song "Mon" from the soundtrack became extremely popular and is still a crowd favourite. A Hindi version of the song was used as the intro song for Love Story, a TV series in SAB TV.

Line up – Sidhartha Sankar "Sidhu" Ray [vocals], Sibaji "Baji" Paul [drums], Sanjay Bhattacharya [guitar], Kanishka (Pinky) Sarkar [keyboard], Shubayan Ganguly [bass], Abhijit Barman (Pota) [vocal]

Rajar Raja (2002–2004)

The band released its second album titled 'Rajar Raja' in 2004. The band with this album moved ahead and incorporated new sounds. Different genres of music were experimented with within the album. Buddho Heshechhen and Lash Kata Ghore are examples of classic rock, flirting with folk rock in 'Bodhu re', while Rajar Raja portrays influences from funk rock. Though this album had new sounds, the nostalgic quotient was very much there with songs like Udaaner Gaan, Krishti, Ude Jete Chay, and Kamalar Swami representing blues and the psychedelic facet of the band's sound.

Line up – Sidhartha Sankar "Sidhu" Ray [vocals], Sibaji "Baji" Paul [drums], Sanjay Bhattacharya [guitar], Kanishka (Pinky) Sarkar [keyboard], Sandip Roy [bass], Abhijit Barman (Pota)[vocal]

Tuchho (2004–2008)
The band released its third album, Tuccho, in 2008. The band with this album moved ahead and has incorporated new sounds. Different genres of music were experimented with in the album. Traces of hard rock were clearly visible. They were then featured in the Rock Street Journal's February 2009 issue. Tuccho contained the hits "Bhalo Theko" and "Rater Pari".

line up – Sidhartha Sankar "Sidhu" Ray [vocals], Sibaji "Baji" Paul [drums], Allan Ao [guitar], Sudipto Banerjee [keyboard], Sandip Roy [bass], Sayak Bandyopadhay [vocals]

Blah Blah Blah (2013)
Blah Blah Blah was their fourth album. It was considered a very experimental album for them. Asha Audio produced the album and it was published on 3 October 2013.

line up – Sidhartha Sankar "Sidhu" Ray [vocals], Sibaji "Baji" Paul [drums], Ritaprabha "Ratul" Ray [guitar], Sudipto Banerjee [keyboard], Sandip Roy [bass], Dibyendu Mukherjee [vocal]

Tobuo Thik Acche (2017–2019) 
In 2017, Abhijit Barman (Pota) left the band due to differences in opinion. By then the band had already started working on their next album Tobuo Thik Acche. They had to rework some of the tracks. Finally, the songs were published as musical videos on their official YouTube channel from 2017 to 2019.

line up- Siddhartha Sankar "Sidhu" Ray [vocals], Sibaji "Baji" Paul [drums], Ritaprabha "Ratul" Ray [guitar], Sudipto "Buti" Banerjee [keyboard], Mainak "Bumpy" Nag Chowdhury, Dibyendu Mukherjee [vocal]

Singles as singer-songwriter/composer

Filmography

As Singer/ Lyricist/Music Director 
Ray has worked as lyricist, music director & singer for the following films.

Jingles and Advertisements 

 Flipkart Big Billion Day – 2018 – Writer

Cactus Band 

 Current members

Sidhartha Sankar "Sidhu" Ray - Vocals

Abhijit Barman Pata - Vocals

Boidurjo Chowdhury - Guitar

Samrat Mukherjee - Guitar

Sayantan Chatterjee - Keyboard

Prasanto Mahato - Bass

Arnab Tabla Dasgupta - Drums

 Past members

Sanjay guitar

Sukanti guitar

Kanishka (Pinky) keyboard

Shubayan bass

Rajesh vox

Sayak vox

Indra keyboard

Allan guitar

Sandip Roy bass

Abhirup Biswas guitar

Subhajit Bhowmick bass

Saqi vocals

Shibaji Baji Paul drums

Sudipto Buti Banerjee keyboard

Writings 
Ray's writings have been featured in various online & print magazines & newspapers.

Director 
Ray has written & directed one short film, HaaBaaB in the year 2015.

Acting 
Ray's career as an actor.

References 

Living people
Singers from Kolkata
20th-century Indian male singers
20th-century Indian singers
Indian male singer-songwriters
Lyricists
Year of birth missing (living people)